Samuel Şahin-Radlinger (born 7 November 1992) is an Austrian professional footballer who plays as a goalkeeper for Austrian Football Bundesliga club SV Ried.

Club career
Şahin-Radlinger was developed by the youth system of SV Ried, and his first experience of first-team football came during a loan spell at Union St. Florian of the Austrian Regional League Central during the 2010–11 season.

Shortly afterwards, in June 2011, Şahin-Radlinger was signed by German club Hannover 96. He spent the next two years as first-choice goalkeeper for Hannover's reserve team in the Regionalliga Nord before joining Rapid Wien on a two-year loan deal in the summer of 2013. He made his Bundesliga debut in a 0–0 draw with Wiener Neustadt on 15 December 2013.

On 30 January 2018, Şahin-Radlinger joined Norwegian top-tier team SK Brann on loan for rest of the 2018 season. Brann were given an option to sign him permanently at the end of the loan; however, the club decided against pulling the option and Şahin-Radlinger returned to Hannover 96 at the end of the season.

On 26 June 2019, English side Barnsley confirmed that Samuel had signed a permanent contract with Daniel Stendel's side.

On 13 August 2020, he returned to his first club SV Ried.

International career
Şahin-Radlinger has represented Austria at every level from under-18 to under-21 and was the first-choice goalkeeper of the Austrian squad at the 2011 FIFA Under-20 World Cup.

Personal life
In June 2016, he married actress Sıla Şahin taking on the joint name "Şahin-Radlinger".

Career statistics

References

1992 births
Living people
People from Ried im Innkreis District
Association football goalkeepers
Austrian footballers
SV Ried players
Hannover 96 players
Hannover 96 II players
1. FC Nürnberg players
1. FC Nürnberg II players
SK Rapid Wien players
SK Brann players
Barnsley F.C. players
Bundesliga players
2. Bundesliga players
Eliteserien players
Austrian Football Bundesliga players
Austria youth international footballers
Austria under-21 international footballers
Austrian expatriate footballers
Austrian expatriate sportspeople in Germany
Austrian expatriate sportspeople in England
Expatriate footballers in Germany
Expatriate footballers in Norway
Expatriate footballers in England
Regionalliga players
English Football League players
Footballers from Upper Austria